Sistema Sac Actun (from Spanish and Yucatec Maya meaning "White Cave System") is an underwater cave system situated along the Caribbean coast of the Yucatán Peninsula with passages to the north and west of the city of Tulum. Discovery of a connection to the Sistema Dos Ojos in 2018 made it the longest known underwater cave system. As of January 2023, it the second longest underwater cave system in the world only surpassed by Ox Bel Ha  

The remains of a mastodon and a human female that might be the oldest evidence of human habitation in this area to date have been found in the cave.

History of exploration
The whole of the explored cave system lies within the Municipality of Tulum (state of Quintana Roo).

In early 2007, the underwater cave Sistema Nohoch Nah Chich was connected into and subsumed into Sac Actun making it the longest surveyed underwater cave system in the world.

Since early 2007, these two caves frequently exchanged the title of the longest  underwater cave system in the world. Including connected dry caves makes Sistema Sac Actun with  the second longest cave in Mexico and the third longest worldwide.

In 2018, the discovery of a link between the Sac Actun system (reported to be 263 km long) and the Dos Ojos system in Tulum, Quintana Roo (84 km long) was reported. The connection was found by the Gran Maya Aquifer Project (GAM), led by the cave diver and explorer, Robbie Schmittner. The combined system is reported to be the world's second longest underwater cave system known.

Upper Paleolithic remains
In March 2008, three members of the Proyecto Espeleológico de Tulum and Global Underwater Explorers dive team, Alex Alvarez, Franco Attolini, and Alberto Nava, explored a section of Sistema Aktun Hu known as the pit Hoyo Negro. At a depth of  the divers located the remains of a mastodon, as well as at  a human skull that might be the oldest evidence of human habitation in this area. Additional bones were located and the skeleton was later identified as that of a teenage female now referred to as Naia.

See also

References 

 Steve Gerrard (2000). The Cenotes of the Riviera Maya. . online Version. Retrieved January 14, 2011.

 Sac Actun
Caves of Mexico
Landforms of Quintana Roo
Limestone caves
Sinkholes of Mexico
Tulum (municipality)
Natural history of Quintana Roo
Paleoanthropological sites
Underwater diving sites in Mexico
First 100 IUGS Geological Heritage Sites